"Sweetness and Light" is a song recorded by Australian electronic music group Itch-E and Scratch-E. The song was released in May 1994 and peaked at number 65 on the Australian singles chart.

The group have later said they weren't sure if the song was good with Andy Rantzen saying "When we'd finished mixing 'Sweetness and Light' I said 'Hmm, this is a bit disappointing' and Paul replied 'I know, where did we go wrong?' 
 
At the ARIA Music Awards of 1995, the song won the inaugural ARIA Award for Best Dance Release. In his acceptance speech, Paul Mac controversially declared "We'd like to thank all of Sydney's ecstasy dealers, without whom this award would not be possible." The televised version censored the speech, causing a media frenzy, but Mac was unrepentant, years later calling it "the best career move I ever made. I got in so much trouble for that, but I don't care. I'm still proud of it. I meant every word, and I still do."

Reception
In 2015, "Sweetness and Light" was listed at number 1 in In the Mix's '100 Greatest Australian Dance Tracks of All Time' with Nick Jarvis saying "Paul Mac and Andy Rantzen's greatest track symbolises the turning point when the previously underground rave scene suddenly stepped into the mainstream consciousness."

Track listings
1994 CD single
 "Sweetness and Light" (Radio edit)  - 4:04 
 "Sweetness and Light" (Fanatically Remixed By South End)  - 5:45 
 "Sweetness and Light" (Sound & Suthers At the Controls)  - 5:32 
 "Transcendental" (Alien Headspace's Ideal Forms remix)  - 11:57

2012 Digital single
 "Sweetness and Light"  (Puddles remix)
 "Sweetness and Light"  (StephenFox remix) 	
 "Sweetness and Light"  (Bside's Long mix)	
 "Sweetness and Light"  (Telafonica remix)	
 "Sweetness and Light"  (Highly Dubious remix)	
 "Sweetness and Light"  (Glowing Sugar remix)	
 "Sweetness and Light"  (Vajra remix)

2017 Vinyl single
 "Sweetness and Light" 
 "Sweetness and Light"  (For Life remix)

Charts

Release history

References

 
1994 singles
1994 songs
ARIA Award-winning songs